Locman Italy, founded on the Island of Elba in 1986 in the Tuscan archipelago, is an Italian company, which produces wristwatches. The name derives from the founding members’ initials, Locci and Mantovani.  In 2006 Locman also founded SIO (the Italian School of Watchmaking) whose headquarters are in Marina di Campo. Locman watches are made of materials, such as titanium, carbon fiber and aluminum.

History 
The founder of the company, Maxi, was born on the Tuscan island but spent his childhood and studied in Milan where his father was born and had a leather company. Inspired by this environment, in 1985 he began designing leather goods, first and foremost a leather strap. Together with his friend and partner Fulvio Locci, Marco went to Basel to introduce his strap to the companies taking part in the watchmaking fair.

The brand was founded in 1996 by Mantovani, the same year he decided to return to the island of Elba. Even today, the design and production of Locman watches is still carried out entirely on the island.

Recent development 
Today the Locman company has expanded its market, combining the Locman signature with other products, such as bags and glasses, thanks to the purchase of the Magia Eyewear group in 2016. This debut was promoted by the Italian singer Vasco Rossi.

Production 
In the early years, Mantovani and Locci designed and produced models for other brands in the Marina di Campo and Milan offices. Starting in the nineties, the two partners decided to create their own brand models, which gained recognition. In cooperation with the armed forces, models were produced for the Navy and the Air Force. In 2007 on the occasion of the release of the new Fiat 500 on the market, a limited series of 500 watches inspired by this car was produced. Today the company has a turnover of more than 20 million euros, 70 employees and a distribution network in Europe, the United States, the Middle East and Japan. But, in its early years, the company was not well known to the watchmaking market until Hollywood actors like Sharon Stone and Jennifer Lopez along with sport stars like David Beckham started wearing Locmans and brought the company to become well known in the watchmaking field.

References

External links 
 About Locman

Elba
Watch manufacturing companies of Italy
Italian brands
Manufacturing companies established in 1986
Italian companies established in 1986
Companies based in Tuscany
Watch brands